Indra Kumar  is an Indian film director and producer. He had five Filmfare nominations, has also appeared in number of Gujarati. Kumar's real name is Indra Irani. His latest film produced is Thank God (2022).

Kumar debuted into direction as well as production with Dil (1990) and then directed the different concept-based drama films Beta (1992), Raja (1995) and Ishq (1997); all four being among the highest-grossing Hindi films of respective years and critically as well as commercially successful. He received two Filmfare Award for Best Director nominations for Beta and Raja. He followed this with a number of average grossers or commercial failures, causing a setback, except the comedy Masti (2004), which ended with Dhamaal (2007). Kumar went on to make commercially successful comedy film sequels including Double Dhamaal (2011), Grand Masti (2013) and Total Dhamaal (2019). The latter ranks among the highest-grossing Hindi films and remains his highest-grossing release till date.

Personal life
He is the brother of actress Aruna Irani. He is father of actress Shweta Kumar.

Career

1990–97: Directorial debut and wider success
In 1990, Kumar made his directorial debut with the romance Dil starring Aamir Khan and Madhuri Dixit. The film was nominated for eight awards at the 36th Filmfare Awards, including a nomination in the Best Film category for Kumar.

The drama Beta (1992), based on the concept of how greediness overtakes family values, was Kumar's next directorial venture. The film starred Madhuri Dixit, Anil Kapoor, and Kumar's elder sister Aruna Irani, and proved to be a major commercial success as well as the highest-grossing Indian film of the year just like Dil. For directing the film, Kumar received his first Best Director nomination at Filmfare.

In 1995, Kumar once again collaborated with Dixit in the romantic action film Raja, which also starred Sanjay Kapoor. The film, which narrated the story of a man and woman who were about to get married in their childhood but fall in love and get married in their youth, proved to be the 3rd highest-grossing Indian film of the year. Kumar received a second Best Director nomination at Filmfare.

In 1997, Kumar directed the action romantic comedy Ishq starring Ajay Devgn, Aamir Khan, Kajol, and Juhi Chawla. The film, based on the subject of true love, received negative reviews from critics but proved to be one of the year's top-grossing productions with grossing revenues of  worldwide.

1999–2006: Commercial failures and Masti
From 1999 to 2006, Kumar continued to direct a number of films but experienced a setback. These films were Mann, Aashiq, Rishtey, Masti (the first film of the Masti franchise), and Pyare Mohan. With the exception of Masti which was moderately successful, all these films were commercial failures, despite being critical successes.

2007–present: Resurgence and expansion into comedies
Kumar's directorial career prospects briefly improved when he directed the ensemble comedy Dhamaal (2007), the first film of the Dhamaal franchise, starring Sanjay Dutt, Riteish Deshmukh, Aashish Chaudhary, Arshad Warsi, and Javed Jaffrey. The film received unfavourable reactions from critics and was a commercial success, grossing over  worldwide.

After a four-year absence from directing films, Kumar directed Double Dhamaal (2011). A sequel to Dhamaal (2007), it retained the five previous lead actors, and also added Kangana Ranaut and Mallika Sherawat in the roles of Sanjay Dutt's sister and wife respectively. Collecting totally  worldwide, Double Dhamaal proved to be a box office hit, despite being critically panned unlike its predecessor

Kumar's next directorial venture was yet another comedy film sequel–Grand Masti (2013)–a sequel to Masti. It saw Riteish Deshmukh, Aftab Shivdasani, and Vivek Oberoi, reprising their roles from Masti, with Karishma Tanna, Manjari Fadnis, and Sonali Kulkarni entering the cast as the new female leads.

The following year, Kumar directed the drama Super Nani (2014), which starred Sharman Joshi, Rekha, Randhir Kapoor, Anupam Kher, and Kumar's daughter Shweta Kumar. It failed to do well at the box office. He next directed the third installment of the Masti franchise, titled Great Grand Masti (2016), again starring the previous three male leads.

In 2019, Kumar directed the third installment of the Dhamaal franchise, titled Total Dhamaal, which was not a sequel to Double Dhamaal and was a reboot to it, having a different story and a different genre of adventure comedy. Ajay Devgn, Madhuri Dixit, Anil Kapoor, Riteish Deshmukh, Javed Jaffrey, Arshad Warsi, Boman Irani, and Esha Gupta played the lead roles (Deshmukh, Jaffrey, and Warsi reprised their roles). Total Dhamaal proved to be Kumar's highest-grossing film release, collecting  within 12 days of its release, thus attaining a super hit status.

Kumar will next direct Hera Pheri 3, the third installment of the comedy franchise Hera Pheri, starring Akshay Kumar, Paresh Rawal, and Suniel Shetty. Kumar announced to direct the film after the death of Neeraj Vora, who directed the second installment and was to direct Hera Pheri 3 too. Later, reports suggested that Kumar will not direct Hera Pheri 3, so Priyadarshan, who was the director of the first installment, will return for Hera Pheri 3. But it was later finally confirmed by Kumar that he will direct the film. Furthermore, Kumar will also direct the fourth installment of the Dhamaal franchise, titled Full on Dhamaal, which will feature Ajay Devgn, Riteish Deshmukh, Javed Jaffrey, and Arshad Warsi reprising their roles, with Sanjay Dutt and Aashish Chaudhary returning to play the lead roles in this installment though they did not were seen in Total Dhamaal.

Filmography

As director
 Dil (1990)
 Beta (1992)
 Raja (1995)
 Ishq (1997)
 Mann (1999)
 Aashiq (2001)
 Rishtey (2002)
 Masti (2004)
 Pyare Mohan (2006)
 Dhamaal (2007)
 Double Dhamaal (2011)
 Grand Masti (2013)
 Super Nani (2014)
 Great Grand Masti (2016)
 Total Dhamaal (2019)
 Thank God (2022)

As producer
 Mohabbat (1985)
 Kasam (1988)
 Daddy Cool: Join the fun (2009)

Frequent actor collaborations

References

External links
 

21st-century Indian film directors
Gujarati film producers
Irani people
Living people
Male actors in Gujarati-language films
Year of birth missing (living people)
Hindi-language film directors
Hindi film producers